The 1999–00 Tetley's Bitter Cup was the 29th edition of England's rugby union club competition. Wasps won the competition defeating Northampton in the final. The event was sponsored by Tetley's Brewery and the final was held at Twickenham Stadium.

Draw and results

First round (19 September)

Away team progress*

Second round (16 October)

Third round (13 & 14 November)

Fourth round (1 & 3 January)

 Orrell progress by virtue of more tries

Fifth round (29 & 30 January)

Quarter-finals (26 February)

Semi-finals (8 April)

Final

References

1999–2000 rugby union tournaments for clubs
1999–2000 in English rugby union
1999-2000